Ventriloquism is the 12th studio album from Meshell Ndegeocello, released on March 16, 2018. The album covers eleven R&B and pop tracks originally recorded in the 1980s and 1990s. It was nominated for Best Urban Contemporary Album at the 2019 Grammy Awards.

A portion of the profits of the album will go to the ACLU.

Track listing

Charts

References

External links
Interview with Billboard
Review from NPR

2018 albums
Meshell Ndegeocello albums
Covers albums
Naïve Records albums
Pop albums by American artists